Sukhorechka is a rural locality (a selo) and the administrative centre of Sukhorechensky Selsoviet, Bizhbulyaksky District, Bashkortostan, Russia. The population was 775 as of 2010. There are 7 streets.

Geography 
Sukhorechka is located 30 km northwest of Bizhbulyak (the district's administrative centre) by road. Novy Biktyash is the nearest rural locality.

References 

Rural localities in Bizhbulyaksky District